Round Pond is a small glacial lake in the Town of Berlin, Rensselaer County, New York, United States.  The lake is located on a geologic formation known as the Rensselaer Plateau.

References 

Lakes of Rensselaer County, New York
Lakes of New York (state)